"In the Kitchen" is a song by R. Kelly.

In The Kitchen may also refer to:

Albums
In the Kitchen (Eddie "Lockjaw" Davis album), 1958

Songs
"In The Kitchen", a 1958 song by Eddie "Lockjaw" Davis
"In The Kitchen", a 2005 song by Field Music, included on the compilation Write Your Own History
"In the Kitchen", a 2005 song by Umphrey's McGee
"In the Kitchen", a song by Killer Mike from the 2009 album Underground Atlanta
"In the Kitchen", a song by Matthew Herbert from the 1998 album Around the House
"In the Kitchen", a song by The Tough Alliance from the 2005 album The New School

Television
En La Cocina (English:  In The Kitchen ), an American television cooking program

Books
In the Kitchen (novel), by Monica Ali